Urlich "Uli" Spiess (born 15 August 1955) is an Austrian former alpine skier.

Career
During his career he has achieved 22 results among the top 10 (7 podiums) in the World Cup.

World Cup results
Victories

References

External links
 
 

1955 births
Living people
Austrian male alpine skiers
Sportspeople from Innsbruck